Krasnoyarsk  is the largest city and administrative center of Krasnoyarsk Krai, Russia. It is situated along the Yenisey River, and is the second-largest city in Siberia after Novosibirsk, with a population of over 1.1 million. Krasnoyarsk is an important junction of the renowned Trans-Siberian Railway, and is one of the largest producers of aluminium in the country.

The city is known for its natural landscape; author Anton Chekhov judged Krasnoyarsk to be the most beautiful city in Siberia. The Stolby Nature Sanctuary is located 10 km south of the city. Krasnoyarsk is a major educational centre in Siberia, and hosts the Siberian Federal University. In 2019, Krasnoyarsk was the host city of the 2019 Winter Universiade, the third hosted in Russia.

Etymology
The fort was named Krasny Yar after the Yarin (a dialect of Khakas) name of the place it was built, Kyzyl Char ('red steep-riverbank'), which was translated as Krasny Yar.

History

The city was founded on August 19, 1628 as a Russian border fort when a group of service class people from Yeniseysk led by Andrey Dubenskiy arrived at the confluence of the Kacha and Yenisei Rivers and constructed fortifications intended to protect the frontier from attacks of native peoples who lived along the Yenisei and its tributaries. Along with Kansk to the east, it represented the southern limit of Russian expansion in the Yenisei basin during the seventeenth century. In the letter to Tsar Michael I the Cossacks reported:
...The town of trunks (log buildings) we have constructed and around the place of fort, we the servants of thee, our Lord, have embedded posts and fastened them with double bindings and the place of fort have strengthened mightily...

The settlement was granted town status in 1690. An intensive growth of Krasnoyarsk began with the arrival of the Siberian Route (the road M53 nowadays) in 1735 to 1741 which connected the nearby towns of Achinsk and Kansk with Krasnoyarsk and with the rest of Russia.

It was excavated by Peter Simon Pallas in 1772 and transported to Krasnoyarsk and subsequently to Saint Petersburg. The Krasnoyarsk meteorite is important because it was the first pallasite ever studied and the first meteorite ever etched.

In 1822 Krasnoyarsk became the administrative center of Yeniseysk Governorate. By the end of the 19th century, Krasnoyarsk had several manufacturing facilities and railroad workshops and an engine-house. Growth continued with the discovery of gold and the arrival of a railroad in 1895.

In the Russian Empire, Krasnoyarsk was one of the places to which political exiles were banished. For example, eight Decembrists were deported from St. Petersburg to Krasnoyarsk after the failure of the revolt.

In the aftermath of the Russian Revolution of 1917, during the Russian Civil War, Siberia east of Omsk was controlled by white forces under Alexander Kolchak, who in December 1919 retreated east to Irkutsk and the Bolsheviks took control of the city. On a plateau 7 km outside of town was a prisoner of war camp with 13,000 German and Austrian troops. Elsa Brändström of the Swedish Red Cross spent almost a year there from July 1919 until May 1920.

During the periods of centralized planning (Five Year Plans) numerous large plants and factories were constructed in Krasnoyarsk: Sibtyazhmash, the dock yard, the paper factory, the hydroelectric power station (now the fifth largest in the world and the second in Russia), and the river port.

In 1934, Krasnoyarsk Krai was formed, with Krasnoyarsk as its administrative center.

During Stalinist times, Krasnoyarsk was a major center of the gulag system. The most important labor camp was the Kraslag or Krasnoyarsky ITL (1938-c.1960) with the two units located in Kansk and Reshyoty. In the city of Krasnoyarsk itself, the Yeniseylag or Yeniseysky ITL labor camp was prominent as well during World War II (c. 1940–41).

During World War II, dozens of factories were evacuated from Ukraine and Western Russia to Krasnoyarsk and nearby towns, stimulating the industrial growth of the city. After the war additional large plants were constructed: the aluminum plant, the metallurgic plant, the plant of base metals and many others.

In the late 1970s, the Soviet Union began constructing a phased array radar station at Abalakova, near Krasnoyarsk, which violated the ABM Treaty. Beginning in 1983, the United States demanded its removal, until the Soviet Union admitted the radar station was a violation in 1989. Equipment was slowly removed from the site and by 1992 it was officially declared to be dismantled, though the equipment from the site was likely relocated to a new site near Komsomolsk-na-Amure. Krasnoyarsk was also a home to Krasnoyarsk Northeast air base, which was turned into living blocks after the dissolution of the Soviet Union.

After the dissolution of the Soviet Union and beginning of privatization, many large plants and factories, such as the Krasnoyarsk Aluminum Plant, became owned by alleged criminal authorities and oligarchs, while others were declared bankrupt. The economic transition resulted in a dramatic rise in unemployment and numerous strikes.

The best known financial scandal of the second half of the 1990s happened when ownership of the Krasnoyarsk Aluminum Plant by a known Krasnoyarsk businessman Anatoliy Bykov had been canceled after he was accused of murdering his partner, Vilor Struganov. The accusation eventually turned out to be false. The Krasnoyarsk plant's ownership problems continue through the early 21st century since nearly all of them are owned either by monopolistic financial groups or by oligarchs.

Since the election of Pyotr Pimashkov as the mayor of Krasnoyarsk in 1996, the appearance of the city gradually improved: the old historical buildings were restored, the asphalt walkways were replaced with paving-stone, and numerous squares and recreation areas with fountains were either restored or constructed from scratch. Now the majority of the city keeps only a few traces of its former, drab, post-collapse look.

Geography

The river Yenisei flows from west to east through the city. There are several islands in the river, the largest of which are Tatyshev and Otdyha Isles, used mainly for recreation.

To the south and west, Krasnoyarsk is surrounded by forested mountains averaging  in height above river level. The most prominent of them are Nikolayevskaya Sopka (notable for its ski jumping tracks), Karaulnaya Gora, and Chornaya Sopka, the latter being an extinct volcano. The gigantic rock cliffs of the Stolby Nature Reserve rise from the mountains of the southern bank of the Yenisei, the western hills from the Gremyachaya Griva crest extending westwards up to the Sobakina River, the north is generally plain, except for the Drokinskaya Sopka hill, with forests to the northwest and agricultural fields to the north and east.

The major rivers in and near Krasnoyarsk are the Yenisei, Mana, Bazaikha, and Kacha Rivers, the latter flowing throughout the historical center of the city. Due to the nature of the terrain, a few natural lakes exist in the vicinity of Krasnoyarsk.

The forests close to the city are mostly pine and birch; further afield, aspen becomes dominant in many areas.

Administrative and municipal status
Krasnoyarsk is the administrative center of the krai. Within the framework of administrative divisions, it is, together with one rural locality (the village of Peschanka) incorporated as the krai city of Krasnoyarskan administrative unit with the status equal to that of the districts. As a municipal division, the krai city of Krasnoyarsk is incorporated as Krasnoyarsk Urban Okrug.

City divisions
For administrative purposes, Krasnoyarsk is divided into seven city districts:

 Kirovsky
 Leninsky
 Oktyabrsky
 Sovetsky
 Sverdlovsky
 Tsentralny
 Zheleznodorozhny

Coat of arms

The first version was approved on March 12, 1804. The coat of arms was divided horizontally into two parts, the upper part containing the coat of arms of Tomsk Governorate, and the lower part picturing the Krasny Yar cliff on a silver background. A revised coat of arms, approved on November 23, 1851, had the golden figure of a lion placed on a red heraldic shield with a spade in the right fore paw and a sickle in the left fore paw, both made of the same metal. The shield was topped with the golden crown of the Russian Empire. The current coat of arms (as depicted here) was approved on November 28, 2004. It contains the same red shield as in 1851 but with a slightly changed figure of the lion in the officially approved image. The shield is topped with a form of the mural crown, which is the golden five-tower coronet of rank of a federal subject administrative center.

Climate
Krasnoyarsk experiences a humid continental climate (Köppen climate classification Dfb) bordering on a subarctic climate (Dfc). Krasnoyarsk has high differentials between summer and winter temperatures.

Demographics
The population count by year:

Population count by districts (2010 Census):
 Kirovsky: 114,715
 Leninsky: 145,530
 Oktyabrsky: 153,112
 Sovetsky: 281,284
 Sverdlovsky: 130,596
 Tsentralny: 55,060
 Zheleznodorozhny: 93,529

The population of Krasnoyarsk includes a number of peoples, the most numerous are Russians, Ukrainians, Tatars, Germans, and Belarusians. Lately the number of Tajiks, Uzbeks and other Central Asian and Caucasian peoples has grown extensively because of the vast, often illegal immigration in search for work.

Another populous immigrant group is the Chinese who, unlike other foreign workers, are employed in much more lucrative areas and often form business partnerships with local companies. Many Chinese trade at the bazaars, and a special large Chinese bazaar named Sodruzhestvo (Russian for fellowship), and the Chinese Trading Town (known in Russian as Китайский торговый город) or colloquially Kitai-gorod on Strelka.

Architecture

There are a number of historical buildings in Krasnoyarsk, the oldest of them being the Intercession Cathedral (1785 to 1795, restored in 1977 to 1978). Other locally significant samples of Russian Orthodox architecture are the Annunciation Cathedral (1802–12), the Holy Trinity Cathedral (1802–12), John the Baptist Church (1899, former episcopal residence), and the new Michael the Archangel Church (1998 to 2003).

On the top of the Karaulnaya Hill, originally a pagan shrine, later occupied by the Krasnoyarsk fort watchtower, the Paraskeva Pyatnitsa Chapel (1804, rebuilt 1854–55) still stands. The chapel, displayed on the 10-ruble note, is one of the iconic images of the city. The chapel was abandoned and fell into disrepair during the Soviet era and only when Perestroyka came was it regained by the Yenisei bishopric.

Another unofficial symbol of Krasnoyarsk is the incomplete 24-story tower located at Strelka. Construction of the tower had been started just before Perestroyka and then frozen due to the administrative crisis. The outline of the tower is clearly seen from many places in the city.

A bridge near Krasnoyarsk carries the Trans-Siberian Railway across the Yenisei. The original structure, one of the longest at the time, was constructed between 1893 and 1896 to an award-winning design by Lavr Proskuryakov. In 2003 it was rejected for emergency inscription on the World Heritage List. It was described at the time by ICOMOS "an early representation of a typical parabolic polygonal truss bridge in Russia" which became "a testing ground for the application of engineering theories and the development of new innovative solutions, which had numerous successors". The bridge was dismantled between 2002-2007.

Among other notable buildings are the mansions of the merchant Nikolay Gadalov (beginning of the 20th century), the Roman Catholic Transfiguration Chapel (1911, also known as the Krasnoyarsk Organ Hall), the Krasnoyarsk Krai Museum stylized as an Ancient Egyptian temple, the Krasnoyarsk Cultural/Historical Center and the triumphal arch at the Spit (2003), the regional administration building flanked with two towers known as the "Donkey Ears".

There are a number of two-story wooden houses in the city built mostly in the middle of the 20th century as temporary habitations. Many urbanized villages located inside the city keep the remnants of the traditional Russian village architecture: wooden houses with backyards, many somewhat dilapidated now but still inhabited.

Culture

There are a number of local holidays celebrated annually in Krasnoyarsk. The most significant holiday is the Day of the City celebrated in June, usually with a carnival. Other holidays and cultural events are the Mana Festival (. The celebrations take place on the outside of town, on the bank of river Mana) usually held on the last weekend in June with the traditional bard contest, the International Museum Biennale traditionally held in the Krasnoyarsk Cultural/Historical Center, the avant-garde Museum Night festival dedicated to the International Museum Day (May 18), the Jazz on Yenisey festival, the Stolbist Day held many times a year celebrating the traditions of mountain climbing in the Stolby national reserve, and the Bikers' Rally.

Krasnoyarsk has a number of local television companies and the highly developed telecommunications, many districts of the city have LAN-based broadband Internet access.

The city is also home to the Krasnoyarsk Children's Choir, a world-renowned choir that tours in many countries as The Little Eagles of Siberia.

Education and science
Next to Novosibirsk, Krasnoyarsk is a prominent scientific and educational center of Siberia, with over 30 higher education facilities, many of which are the branches of the Russian Academy of Science, and about 200 high schools. The most notable higher education institutes are:
 Siberian Federal University (Russian abbreviation is SFU), founded on November 4, 2006. The institution integrated four large higher education institutions (Krasnoyarsk State University, Krasnoyarsk State Academy of Architecture and Civil Construction, Krasnoyarsk State Technical University, State University of Non-Ferrous Metals and Gold)
 Krasnoyarsk State Pedagogical University (Russian abbreviation is KGPU), founded in 1932
 Siberian State Technological University (Russian abbreviation is SibGTU), the oldest in the city, founded in 1930 as the Siberian Institute of Forest
 Siberian State Aerospace University (Russian abbreviation is SibGAU), founded in 1960
 Krasnoyarsk State Medical University (Russian abbreviation is KrasGMU), founded in 1942
 Krasnoyarsk State Agrarian University (Russian abbreviation is Krasnoyarsk GAU), founded in 1952
Like Novosibirsk, Krasnoyarsk has a special city district called Akademgorodok ("Academic Town"), where several scientific research institutes are located. Krasnoyarsk's Institute of Biophysics is known for a 1973–1985 experiment on ecological isolation of human beings (the "Bios Experiment"). Sukachev Institute of Forest, founded in 1944 at Moscow and relocated to Krasnoyarsk in 1959.
There are several museums in Krasnoyarsk. One is the Krasnoyarsk Regional Museum, containing historical items and exhibits of the region, including ancient history, native Siberians, and woolly rhinos.

The Krasnoyarsk zoo is also a major attraction for residents and tourists.

Transportation

Metro
An underground system (three lines) has been in planning and construction phases in Krasnoyarsk for decades. Subway construction was terminated in 2008.

Public Transportation 
The transit system is dominated by buses, but there also are several trolleybus and tram routes.

Railway

Krasnoyarsk lies on the Yenisei River and historically has been an important junction on the Trans-Siberian Railway.
Krasnoyarsk-Passazhirsky (lit. Krasnoyarsk-Passenger) is the main railway station of Krasnoyarsk. Long-range trains of the Trans-Siberian Railway stop at this station. There are some stations served by Elektrichka and there is Krasnoyarsk-East goods station 26.3 km east of Krasnoyarsk-Passazhirsky.

Airports
The secondary Cheremshanka Airport handled short-haul flights. Cheremshanka has lost its eminent role as the main base airport for an extensive network of local air services (MVL) in Krasnoyarsk Krai formerly served by the local Aeroflot Krasnoyarsk Directorate. In December 2011 a fire broke out at the Cheremshanka airport which destroyed the terminal building and the air traffic control tower.

Tourism
Stolby is also a major rock climbing location. Many local climbers intentionally do not use any belaying equipment and call their extreme sport stolbizm, known elsewhere as solo climbing.

Other popular showplaces include the Krasnoyarsk Hydroelectric Power Station dam, the Karaulnaya Gora hill with the Paraskeva Pyatnitsa Chapel, museums, theaters, etc.

Sports
Krasnoyarsk is a center of Siberian sports. Areas, where Krasnoyarsk excels compared to other Russian cities, include rugby union, bandy, and freestyle wrestling.

Yenisey was the Soviet bandy champions every year in the 1980s as well as in 1991. The first Russian title came in 2001. In 2014 they became champions of the Bandy Super League and had the highest average attendance, 5 747. In 2015 the league title was won again as well as in 2016. At the 2019 Winter Universiade, bandy will feature as a demonstration sport for the first time and tournaments for both men and women will be held. An indoor stadium will be built for the occasion. It is planned to be ready for use by the end of 2018. The complexity of the construction is considered unique.

The city is considered a stronghold of rugby union in Russia, to the extent that the Rugby Union of Russia was headquartered locally for many years. Two Krasnoyarsk clubs, Krasny Yar and Enisey-STM, participate in the national Professional Rugby League, and European Rugby Challenge Cup, the second-tier pan-European club competition. Matches take precedence in the local media, and the city derby match can attract crowds of about 3000–5000. Many players of the Russian national rugby team hail from the area. Some of Russia's international rugby matches are played at the Central Stadium.

Former Carolina Hurricanes left winger Alexander Semin is from Krasnoyarsk.

Host of the international wrestling tournament named after Ivan Yarygin.

Sport events

The 2019 Winter Universiade was hosted by Krasnoyarsk in 2019.

Notable people

 Viktor Astafyev, writer
 Vyacheslav Butusov, singer and songwriter
Caziel, artist
Walter Ciszek, Polish-American Jesuit priest held captive here on suspicion of espionage for the Vatican
Valentin Danilov, Russian scientist
Elena Abramovna Davidovich, numismatist and archaeologist
Helene Fischer, German singer and actress
 Iya Gavrilova, ice hockey player
 Dmitri Hvorostovsky, operatic baritone
Evgeny Isakov, ice hockey player
 Elena Khrustaleva, biathlete
 Sergey Ivanovich Lomanov, bandy manager and former player
 Sergey Sergeyevich Lomanov, bandy player
 Andreï Makine, novelist
 Yevgeni Popov, writer
 Sofia Samodurova, figure skater
 Alexander Semin, ice hockey player
 Andrei Shepelenko, professional ice hockey player
 Pyotr Slovtsov, opera singer
Vasily Surikov, historic painter
Viktoria Tereshkina, prima ballerina
 Evgeny Ustyugov, biathlete
 Viktor Tretiakov, violinist
Andrey Vorobyov, governor of Moscow Oblast

Twin towns – sister cities

Krasnoyarsk is twinned with:

 Heihe, China (1999)
 Istaravshan, Tajikistan (2000)
 Sault Ste. Marie, Canada (2002)
 Ulaanbaatar, Mongolia (2003)
 Samarkand, Uzbekistan (2003)
 Oneonta, United States (2004)
 Cremona, Italy (2006)
 Žilina, Slovakia (2013)
 Changchun, China (2014)
 Manzhouli, China (2017)

Cooperation agreements
Krasnoyarsk  has cooperation agreements with:

   Kokshetau, Kazakhstan (2022)

See also

References

Notes

Sources

External links

  
 Interactive online map of Krasnoyarsk 
 The Siberian Federal University homepage 
 

 
1628 establishments in Russia
Populated places established in 1628
World Heritage Tentative List
Yeniseysk Governorate
Populated places on the Yenisei River
Cities and towns in Krasnoyarsk Krai